Former U.S. President Donald Trump became widely known during the 2016 United States presidential election and his subsequent presidency for using nicknames to criticize, insult, or otherwise express commentary about media figures, politicians, and foreign leaders.

The list excludes commonly-used hypocorisms such as "Mike" for "Michael" or "Steve" for "Steven", unless they are original to Trump. Nicknames that Trump did not originate are annotated with footnotes.

The list also includes nicknames used by figures associated with Trump, and nicknames he has promoted via retweeting.

Domestic political figures

Foreign leaders

Media figures

Groups of people

Other people

Organizations

Television programs

Miscellaneous

See also 

 List of nicknames used by George W. Bush
 List of nicknames of presidents of the United States
 Lists of nicknames – nickname list articles on Wikipedia

Notes

References 

Nicknames
Nicknames
Lists of 21st-century people
Lists of nicknames
Lists of pejorative terms for people
Twitter-related lists
Glossaries of politics
Trump, Donald
Wikipedia glossaries using tables